Hohne may refer to one of the following:

 Hohne, a municipality in Germany
 Bergen-Hohne, a military training ground and garrison

See also 
 Hohn (disambiguation)
 Höhne (disambiguation)